Lego DC Shazam!: Magic and Monsters is a 2020 American computer-animated superhero comedy film based on the DC Comics and Lego brands. The film is produced by DC Entertainment, The Lego Group and Warner Bros. Animation and distributed by Warner Bros. Home Entertainment. It is the tenth Lego DC Comics film and was released on digital on April 28, and on Blu-ray and DVD on June 16, 2020. The film received positive reviews from critics, with praise for the humor and action.

Plot

A hero known as Shazam has made his debut and is attracting the media's attention for his sudden arrival and polite mannerisms. Unbeknownst to the public, he is a young orphan boy named Billy Batson. Superman is ordered to report on the farm market of Metropolis when he encounters the Monster Society of Evil when they attempt to steal food for their master, Mister Mind. However, he eventually calls Batman, Wonder Woman, The Flash, and Green Lantern for help. Witnessing this, Shazam decides to aid the Justice League, demonstrating his powers to them and forcing the Monster Society to retreat. Impressed by Shazam's capabilities, the League invite him to the Hall of Justice, where they offer Shazam membership. Shazam dismisses their offer, believing they will reject him if they discover his actual age.

Consulting The Wizard, who gave him his powers for advice, Shazam is told that relationships are built on trust and that he should be more open to the Justice League. Sensing a disturbance, the Wizard then tells Shazam to help the Justice League when they follow the Monster Society to their warehouse hideout, which Shazam agrees to do.
 
Unfortunately, Mister Mind captures the Justice League and, using a chemical concocted by Doctor Sivana, transforms them into children, making them more susceptible to his mind control. Although de-aged, Batman avoids being mind-controlled and escapes to the Batcave with Shazam's help. Learning that Batman is reluctant to trust him, Shazam reveals his secret identity to Batman while also recounting his origin story to him: After aiding Batman in a duel with Two-Face, Billy Batson continued to go about his daily routine while also generously helping out others in need (whom, unbeknownst to him, are the Wizard in disguise). Billy is eventually led into a subway station, where he boards a bizarre-looking train that takes him to the Rock of Eternity, where he meets the Wizard in person. The Wizard explains that he disguised himself as ordinary citizens to test Billy's purity of heart and see if he was worthy of becoming his new champion after the previous champion, Black Adam, became corrupted by his power and was sealed away. Accepting the Wizard's offer, Billy is gifted his new powers and proceeds to spend his days as Shazam while also enjoying the perks of being an adult. Billy then explains that despite everything, he still longs for a family of his own. Regarding Billy's status as an orphan, Batman reveals his secret identity to Billy and explains that he, too, is an orphan and becomes more trusting of Billy.

Across the world, the mind-controlled Justice Leaguers proceed to steal large quantities of food for Mister Mind, but one by one, they are located by Batman and Shazam and freed from Mister Mind's control. Reunited, the Justice League devise a plan to infiltrate the Monster Society's lair by pretending to capture Batman and Shazam and bring them to Mister Mind. Unfortunately, they are swiftly exposed and forced to fight their way to Mister Mind, ultimately defeating the Monster Society. When Shazam and the Justice League encounter Mister Mind, they discover that he has undergone metamorphosis and grown into a giant moth.

The group attempt to escape to the Rock of Eternity to gain help from the Wizard, but Mister Mind follows them and proceeds to devour the Rock, resulting in him increasing in size and freeing Black Adam from his imprisonment. Black Adam betrays Mister Mind by using his powers to reduce him to his caterpillar form and send him hurtling through space.

Seeking vengeance against the Wizard, Black Adam attacks the Rock, and the Justice League is overwhelmed by him. The Wizard attempts to hold Black Adam back long enough for Shazam and the Justice League to escape back to Earth while reminding Shazam about the power of Zeus. Returning to Earth, knowing Black Adam will be coming for them, the Justice League make preparations and rebuild their vehicles to account for their reduced stature.

Arriving on Earth, Black Adam announces his intentions to rule over it with an iron fist. The Justice League and Shazam arrive and face him, but he still proves too much for them to handle and destroys their vehicles. Remembering the Wizard's advice and how Black Adam was able to depower Mister Mind, Shazam shares his power with the Justice League, enhancing their abilities and returning them to their normal age while revealing his secret identity to them in the process. The Justice Leaguers are not upset and tell him that the age of a hero doesn't matter as long as they do the right thing. Using their enhanced abilities, the Justice League defeats Black Adam. Billy then reabsorbs his powers from the League and Black Adam, restoring his Shazam powers, while Black Adam's powers are taken in the process, reducing him to a mortal man.

With Black Adam arrested and their adulthood restored, the Justice League show their gratitude by reuniting Billy with his sister Mary and their Uncle Dudley.

In a mid-credit scene, Lobo manages to apprehend Mister Mind and plans to collect a $1,000,000,000,000 bounty placed on his head, much to Mister Mind's dismay.

Cast
 Sean Astin as Shazam 
 Zach Callison as Billy Batson, Jimmy Olsen
 Troy Baker as Batman / Bruce Wayne, Carmine Falcone
 Nolan North as Superman / Clark Kent, Alfred Pennyworth
 Grey Griffin as Wonder Woman, Lois Lane
 Cristina Milizia as Green Lantern / Jessica Cruz
 James Arnold Taylor as The Flash, Dummy
 Imari Williams as Black Adam / Teth-Adam
 Fred Tatasciore as Lobo, Oom
 Ralph Garman as Wizard
 Dee Bradley Baker as Jeepers, Dr. Sivana, Crocodile-Man
 Jennifer Hale as Mary Batson, L.N. Ambassador
 Tom Kenny as Penguin, Perry White
 Jonny Rees as Mr. Mind
 Erica Lindbeck as Greeter, Farmer
 Josh Keaton as Executive, Terrance

References

External links
 

2020 direct-to-video films
2020 computer-animated films
Films about sentient toys
Direct-to-video animated films based on DC Comics
2020s superhero comedy films
Animated films based on video games
2020s American animated films
2020s direct-to-video animated superhero films
Films about magic
Films about rapid human age change
Films based on classical mythology
Films set in 2019
Films set in 2020
Captain Marvel (DC Comics) in other media
Warner Bros. Animation animated films
Lego DC Comics Super Heroes films
Animated Justice League films
American direct-to-video films
Warner Bros. direct-to-video films
Warner Bros. direct-to-video animated films
Films directed by Matt Peters
2020s English-language films